Michael Rectenwald (born January 29, 1959) is an American scholar who has taught at several institutions, most notably at New York University (NYU). Although his scholarship has focused primarily on 19th-century British secularism, contemporary secularism, and the 19th-century freethought movement, he may be best known as a critic of the contemporary social justice movement and its effects in the academy, as he describes in his memoir, Springtime for Snowflakes: Social Justice and Its Postmodern Parentage, published in 2018.

Early life and education
Rectenwald's 2018 memoir records that he was the seventh of nine children born. He grew up in a Catholic German-American family on the north side of Pittsburgh, Pennsylvania.

Rectenwald was a graduate of North Catholic High School in 1977. His undergraduate studies in English included a close apprenticeship with Beat Generation poet Allen Ginsberg at Naropa University (formerly Naropa Institute) during the 1979–80 school year. He graduated cum laude from the University of Pittsburgh in 1983 with a B.A. in English literature. In 1997, Case Western Reserve University awarded Rectenwald a master's degree in English literature. In 2004, Carnegie Mellon University conferred upon Rectenwald a Ph.D. in literary and cultural studies. He was recognized by Carnegie Mellon as among its top-performing graduates, when in the span of one year, he published three books.

Academic career
Rectenwald has taught at universities since 1993, including at Case Western Reserve University, Carnegie Mellon University, Duke University, North Carolina Central University, and New York University, where he was a Professor of Liberal and Global Liberal Studies for more than ten years before retiring in January 2019.

Research contributions
Rectenwald has written extensively on the origins of the movement called secularism, which was founded in London in 1851 by George Jacob Holyoake. Rectenwald's research has established that secularism was a significant cultural and philosophical source for agnosticism, and for the emerging new creed of "scientific naturalism” propounded by Thomas Henry Huxley, John Tyndall, Herbert Spencer, and others. Scientific naturalism is noteworthy for being the philosophical basis of "the Darwinian circle," i.e., the 19th century scientists of note most responsible for the general acceptance of Charles Darwin’s theory of evolution via natural selection.

Rectenwald argues in "Secularism and the cultures of nineteenth-century scientific naturalism," published in The British Journal for the History of Science in June 2013: "Not only did early Secularism help clear the way by fighting battles with the state and religious interlocutors, but it also served as a source for what Huxley, almost twenty years later, termed 'agnosticism'...In Holyoake's Secularism we find the beginnings of the mutation of radical infidelity into the respectability necessary for the acceptance of scientific naturalism, and also the distancing of later forms of infidelity incompatible with it. Holyoake's Secularism represents an important early stage of scientific naturalism."

In his book, Nineteenth-Century British Secularism: Science, Religion and Literature, Rectenwald applies the conception of secularity as developed by philosopher Charles Taylor in A Secular Age (2007) to 19th-century Great Britain. The book is interdisciplinary, with chapters treating the secular antipodes Richard Carlile and Thomas Carlyle, the geology of Charles Lyell, the significance of George Jacob Holyoake's secularism, the emergence of scientific naturalism, the religiosity and secularity of the Newman brothers (John Henry Newman, Francis William Newman and Charles Robert Newman) and the postsecularism of the novel Daniel Deronda by George Eliot.

In Holyoake's Secularism, Rectenwald locates a precursor for Charles Taylor’s version of secularity as the immanent frame that structures the conditions of belief and unbelief in modernity. According to a review in Victorian Studies, "Rectenwald thus offers a revisionist interpretation that, rather than understanding Holyoake's leadership of the free thought movement as a failed rhetorical attempt to make society more secular, sees it as marking a distinct moment in modernity."

Critique of social justice and leftism in academia

@antipcnyuprof Twitter account
On September 12, 2016, Rectenwald created the Twitter account @antipcnyuprof and began tweeting criticisms of what he saw as excesses of political correctness and social justice ideology on North American colleges and universities. A student reporter for the Washington Square News, New York University's weekly student newspaper, discovered him; and he subsequently gave an interview revealing himself as the NYU faculty member behind the @antipcnyuprof Twitter handle.

In a November 3, 2016 op-ed at The Washington Post, Rectenwald claimed that two days after the student interview, he was summoned by Dean Fred Schwarzbach and was "strongly encouraged to take a paid leave of absence." Schwarzbach denied Rectenwald's claims and posted all email correspondence between the two from November 1 through November 11, showing that Rectenwald had requested the leave himself. Rectenwald later unsuccessfully sued several colleagues, but the case was dismissed.

Springtime for Snowflakes
In 2018, the conservative New English Review Press published Rectenwald's memoir, Springtime for Snowflakes: Social Justice and Its Postmodern Parentage. Rectenwald recounts his academic career and his intellectual evolution. He critiques the contemporary social justice culture in the academy, arguing that it is rooted in socialist and postmodernist thought and describing its constituent concepts such as deconstruction, belief in toxic masculinity, social constructivism, and radical constructivism. Rectenwald concludes that such ideology has promoted an authoritarian and dogmatic culture in parts of the academy.

Works

Books
 The Eros of the Baby Boom Eras. Bethesda, MD: Apogee Books (1991). Self-published.
 The Thief and Other Stories. Apogee Publishing (2013) self-published.
 Breach: Collected Poems. Apogee Publishing (2013) self-published.
 Rectenwald, Michael, and Lisa Carl. Academic Writing, Real World Topics. Peterborough, Ont.: Broadview Press (May 28, 2015).
 Rectenwald, Michael, Rochelle Almeida and George Levine, eds. Global Secularisms in a Post-Secular Age. Boston: De Gruyter (September 25, 2015).
 Nineteenth-Century British Secularism: Science, Religion and Literature. Houndsmills, Basingstoke, Hampshire, UK; New York: Palgrave Macmillan (2016).
 Rectenwald, Michael and Lisa Carl. Academic Writing, Real World Topics. (Concise Edition). Peterborough, Ont: Broadview Press (July 20, 2016).
 Springtime for Snowflakes: Social Justice and Its Postmodern Parentage. Nashville. TN; London, UK: New English Review Press (2018).
 Google Archipelago: The Digital Gulag and the Simulation of Freedom. Nashville, TN; London, UK: New English Review Press. (September 30, 2019).
 Rectenwald, Michael. Beyond Woke. New English Review Press. (May 18, 2020)
 Thought Criminal. New English Review Press. (December 1, 2020)

Selected articles
 "Reading Around the Kids." In Constance Coiner and Diana Hume George, eds. The Family Track: Keeping Your Faculties while You Mentor, Nurture, Teach, and Serve. University of Illinois Press, (1998): 107–13.
 "Local Histories, Broader Implications." College Composition and Communication 60, no. 2 (2008): 448. 
 Smythe, Thomas W. and Michael Rectenwald. "Craig on God and Morality." International Philosophical Quarterly. 51.3. 203 (September 2011): 331–38.
 "Secularism." In Margaret Harris, ed. George Eliot in Context. Cambridge: Cambridge University Press (2013): 271–78.
 "Secularism and the Cultures of Nineteenth-century Scientific Naturalism." The British Journal for the History of Science. 46.2 (June 2013): 231–54. 
 "Mid-Nineteenth-Century British Secularism and its Contemporary Post-Secular Implications." In Michael Rectenwald, Rochelle Almeida and George Levine, eds. Global Secularisms in a Post- Secular Age. Boston: De Gruyter (2015): 43–64.
 "Introduction: Global Secularisms in a Post-Secular Age." In Michael Rectenwald, Rochelle Almeida and George Levine, eds. Global Secularisms in a Post- Secular Age. Boston and Berlin: De Gruyter (2015): 1–24.
 "Secularism as Modern Secularity." In Ryan T. Cragun, Lori Fazzino, Christel Manning, eds. Organized Secularism in the United States.  Boston and * * Berlin: De Gruyter (November 2017): 31–56.
 "'Social Justice' and Its Postmodern Parentage." Academic Questions. 31.2. (April 10, 2018): 130–139.

References

External links
 
 

1959 births
Living people
Case Western Reserve University alumni
Carnegie Mellon University alumni
New York University faculty
North Carolina Central University faculty
University of Pittsburgh alumni
People from Pittsburgh